Many scripts in Unicode, such as Arabic, have special orthographic rules that require certain combinations of letterforms to be combined into special ligature forms.

In English, the common ampersand (&) developed from a ligature in which the handwritten Latin letters e and t (spelling et, Latin for and) were combined. The rules governing ligature formation in Arabic can be quite complex, requiring special script-shaping technologies such as the Arabic Calligraphic Engine by DecoType.

As of Unicode 15.0, the Arabic script is contained in the following blocks:
Arabic (0600–06FF, 256 characters)
Arabic Supplement (0750–077F, 48 characters)
Arabic Extended-B (0870–089F, 41 characters)
Arabic Extended-A (08A0–08FF, 96 characters)
Arabic Presentation Forms-A (FB50–FDFF, 631 characters)
Arabic Presentation Forms-B (FE70–FEFF, 141 characters)
Rumi Numeral Symbols (10E60–10E7F, 31 characters)
Arabic Extended-C (10EC0-10EFF, 3 characters)
Indic Siyaq Numbers (1EC70–1ECBF, 68 characters)
Ottoman Siyaq Numbers (1ED00–1ED4F, 61 characters)
Arabic Mathematical Alphabetic Symbols (1EE00–1EEFF, 143 characters)

The basic Arabic range encodes the standard letters and diacritics, but does not encode contextual forms (U+0621–U+0652 being directly based on ISO 8859-6); and also includes the most common diacritics and Arabic-Indic digits.
The Arabic Supplement range encodes letter variants mostly used for writing African (non-Arabic) languages.
The Arabic Extended-B and Arabic Extended-A ranges encode additional Qur'anic annotations and letter variants used for various non-Arabic languages.
The Arabic Presentation Forms-A range encodes contextual forms and ligatures of letter variants needed for Persian, Urdu, Sindhi and Central Asian languages.
The Arabic Presentation Forms-B range encodes spacing forms of Arabic diacritics, and more contextual letter forms.
The presentation forms are present only for compatibility with older standards, and are not currently needed for coding text.
The Arabic Mathematical Alphabetical Symbols block encodes characters used in Arabic mathematical expressions.
The Indic Siyaq Numbers block contains a specialized subset of Arabic script that was used for accounting in India under the Mughal Empire by the 17th century through the middle of the 20th century.
The Ottoman Siyaq Numbers block contains a specialized subset of Arabic script, also known as Siyakat numbers, used for accounting in Ottoman Turkish documents.

Contextual forms
A demonstration for the basic alphabet used in Modern Standard Arabic:

Punctuation and ornaments
Only the Arabic question mark ⟨⟩ and the Arabic comma ⟨⟩ are used in regular Arabic script typing and the comma is often substituted for the Latin script comma.

U+066D ٭

Word ligatures
Arabic Presentation Forms-A has a few characters defined as "word ligatures" for terms frequently used in formulaic expressions in Arabic. They are rarely used out of professional liturgical typing, also the Rial grapheme is normally written fully, not by the ligature.

, as in the phrase

Code blocks

Arabic

Character table

Compact table

Arabic Supplement

Arabic Extended-B

Arabic Extended-A

Arabic Presentation Forms A
They are mostly ligatures which can be created from the previous charts' characters, with the exception of the bracket-like graphemes  and some of them are ligatures of common liturgical phrases.

Arabic Presentation Forms B
These can all be created from the basic chart's characters.

Rumi Numeral Symbols

Arabic Extended-C

Indic Siyaq Numbers

Ottoman Siyaq Numbers

Arabic Mathematical Alphabetic Symbols

References

External links
 
 
 Scheherazade or Scheherazade New, an extended Arabic script font designed by SIL International, distributed under the SIL Open Font License (OFL)
 Harmattan, an extended Arabic script font designed by SIL International for West Africa, distributed under the SIL Open Font License (OFL)

Unicode